Stari Vrh Ski Resort is a Slovenian ski resort located at Zapreval in municipality of Škofja Loka. It is a family ski resort, which has 12 km of ski slopes and is just about 20 km away from Škofja Loka and very close to Ljubljana.

Resort statistics
Elevation
Summit - 1216 m / (3,988)
Base - 580 m / (1,912 ft)

Ski Terrain
0,55 km2 (135 acres) - covering  of ski slopes on one mountain.

Slope Difficulty
expert (2 km)
intermediate (6 km)
beginner (4 km)

Vertical Drop
- 636 m - (2,086 ft) in total

Longest Run: "Stari Vrh (sixchair)" 

Average Winter Daytime Temperature: 

Average Annual Snowfall: 

Lift Capacity: 6,000 skiers per hour (all together)

Ski Season Opens: December

Ski Season Ends: March 

Snow Conditions Phone Line: 386 0 (4) 5189007

Other activities
mountain biking, hiking, cross country skiing, sledding

Ski lifts

External links
 starivrh.si - official site

Ski areas and resorts in Slovenia